Eunomus may refer to:

Biology
a bird, the dusky thrush (Turdus eunomus)

Geography
the ancient city also called Euromus

History
Eunomus, king of Sparta
Eunomus, an Athenian Admiral during the Corinthian War.